Šentjanž nad Štorami ( or ) is a settlement in the Municipality of Štore in eastern Slovenia. It lies in the hills just south of Štore itself. The area is part of the traditional region of Styria. It is now included with the rest of the municipality in the Savinja Statistical Region.

Name
The name of the settlement was changed from Šent Janž (literally, 'Saint John') to Šentjanž nad Štorami in 1953.

Church
The local church is dedicated to John the Baptist. It dates to around 1500, although it was partially rebuilt in the 17th and 18th centuries.

References

External links
Šentjanž nad Štorami on Geopedia

Populated places in the Municipality of Štore